Jumbo is a nickname for:

Major League Baseball players
 Jumbo Brown (1907–1966), American relief pitcher
 Jumbo Davis (1861–1921), American third baseman
 Jumbo Díaz (born 1984), Dominican relief pitcher
 Jumbo Elliott (baseball) (1900–1970), American pitcher
 Jumbo McGinnis (1854–1934), American pitcher
 Jumbo Schoeneck (1862–1930), American first baseman

Other sports
 Jumbo Elliott (American football) (born 1965), former National Football League player
 Jumbo Elliott (coach) (1915–1981), American track and field coach
 Anil Kumble (born 1970), Indian Test cricket captain
 Jumbo Milton (1885–1915), South African-born international rugby union player for England
 Masashi Ozaki (born 1947), Japanese golfer
 Jumbo Reason (1884–?), English footballer
 Joe Thornton (born 1979), Canadian National Hockey League player

Other uses
 Al Hirt (1922–1999), American trumpeter and bandleader
 Henry Maitland Wilson (1881–1964), British Army field marshal

Lists of people by nickname